Vladimir Đorđević (also transliterated Vladimir Djordjević; born 25 December 1982) is a Serbian professional footballer who plays as a defender.

Career
Đorđević came through the youth system of Radnički Niš, before breaking into the senior squad in the early 2000s. He was transferred to Brazilian club Fluminense in early 2006. After a year abroad, Đorđević returned to his homeland and joined Red Star Belgrade in January 2007. He won a double in his debut season with the club. In early 2009, Đorđević moved to Hungarian club Győr, collecting a league title medal in the 2012–13 season. In the summer of 2014, Đorđević returned to his parent club Radnički Niš.

Honours
Red Star Belgrade
 Serbian SuperLiga: 2006–07
 Serbian Cup: 2006–07
Győr
 Nemzeti Bajnokság I: 2012–13

References

External links

 
 
 
 Vladimir Đorđević at Utakmica.rs 

1982 births
Living people
Association football defenders
Campeonato Brasileiro Série A players
Expatriate footballers in Brazil
Expatriate footballers in Hungary
FK Radnički Niš players
Fluminense FC players
Győri ETO FC players
Nemzeti Bajnokság I players
Red Star Belgrade footballers
Serbian expatriate footballers
Serbian expatriate sportspeople in Brazil
Serbian expatriate sportspeople in Hungary
Serbian footballers
Serbian SuperLiga players
Sportspeople from Niš